In order to commemorate the first joint edition since 1996, a mixed doubles tournament was held by combining female players of the WTA China Open and the male players of the ATP Beijing Challenger. The tournament had a prize money of USD $6,000, but as this was an exhibition tournament, no points were given for the ATP and WTA rankings.

Matches were played at best of three sets with a Match tie-break replacing the final set, in which a pair must win a 10-point tiebreaker (or by a two-point margin) to win the match. Match tie-breaks were not fully implemented until the 2006 season in official tournaments.

Tripp Phillips and Emmanuelle Gagliardi won the title by defeating Justin Gimelstob and Jill Craybas 6–1, 6–2 in the final.

Seeds

Draw

Draw

References

External links
 Official results archive (ITF)
 Official results archive (WTA)

China Open
China Open
2004 China Open (tennis)